The Hongjiadu Dam is a concrete face rock-fill embankment dam on the Liuchong River in Qianxi County, Guizhou Province, China. The dam supports a 600 MW and withholds a  reservoir.

See also 

 List of power stations in China

References

Hydroelectric power stations in Guizhou
Dams in China
Concrete-face rock-fill dams
Liuchong River
2005 establishments in China
Dams completed in 2005